Double salary saga is the name given by media outlets to a political scandal in Ghana. Between 2012 and 2016, some members of the John Dramani Mahama administration who were ministers or deputy ministers and doubled as members of parliament were alleged to have received double salaries during their term in office. The law however requires such officials to choose to receive salary either as a minister or a member of parliament

See also 
 Corruption in Ghana

References

Corruption in Ghana
Political scandals
2015 in Ghana
2015 crimes in Ghana
2016 in Ghana
2016 crimes in Ghana
2012 in Ghana
2012 crimes in Ghana
2013 in Ghana
2013 crimes in Ghana
2014 in Ghana
2014 crimes in Ghana